Blaise Piffaretti (born 9 March 1966) is a retired Swiss football midfielder and later coach.

Honours

Player
FC Sion
Swiss Championship: 1991–92
Swiss Cup: 1985–86, 1990–91

References

1966 births
Living people
Swiss men's footballers
FC Sion players
Neuchâtel Xamax FCS players
FC Lausanne-Sport players
Association football midfielders
Swiss Super League players
Switzerland under-21 international footballers
Switzerland international footballers